The 1889 Buckingham by-election was held on 11 October 1889 after the incumbent Conservative MP, Egerton Hubbard succeeded to a peerage as the second Baron Addington.  The seat was won by the Liberal candidate Edmund Verney who would later be expelled causing a by-election in 1891.  The Conservative candidate, Evelyn Hubbard was the younger brother of the outgoing MP.

References

By-elections to the Parliament of the United Kingdom in Buckinghamshire constituencies
Buckingham
October 1889 events
1889 elections in the United Kingdom
1889 in England
19th century in Buckinghamshire